The May Bumps 2012 were a set of rowing races held in Cambridge, UK with crews from the boat clubs of all Cambridge University Colleges and Anglia Ruskin University from Wednesday 13 June 2012 to Saturday 16 June 2012. The event was run as a bumps race and was the 121st set of races in the series of May Bumps which have been held annually in mid-June in this form since 1887. In 2012, 172 crews took part (103 men's crews and 69 women's crews), with nearly 1550 participants in total.

The timing of the lower divisions on the Saturday was disrupted by a protest on the river and its tow-path by animal rights activists objecting to the removal from the area of an infamous swan, the so-called Mr. Asbo, that had been attacking rowers. Three people were arrested for breaching the peace.

Head of the River crews

  men rowed over well clear of  men each day to win their blades and retain the headship they won 2011. As they came also first at the Lent Bumps 2012 they hold the double Headship. They also won both bumps events in 2011.

  women rowed-over on each day to hold onto the Head of the River title and win their blades. By winning the Mays they also retain the double Headship having won Lent Bumps 2012. This also their second double headship, having won both bumps events in 2011.

Consecutive double Headships, i.e. that the same Men's and Women's crews have won both the Lent and May Bumps for consecutive years, illustrate how dominant these crews have been on the River Cam.  men have now won 11 of the 15 May Bumps from 1998 (and 8 of the Lent Bumps), whilst  men's and women's 1st VIIIs have been either 1st (head) or second on the river in Lents or Mays for at least the last 2 years (and up to 6 in the case of the Men in Lents).

Highest 2nd VIIIs

Pegasus Cup and the Biggest Risers

  won the Pegasus cup for the first time, narrowly beating  in their attempt to hold the title.  boats collectively managing 15 bumps moving up 18 places in total. The Men's 1st VIII entered division 1 and two of the club's five boats won blades.

 rose an impressive 8 places, triple over-bumping  and bumping , who themselves fell 7 places over the 4 days.

Links to races in other years

Bumps Charts

Below are the bumps charts all 6 men's and all 4 women's divisions, with the men's event on the left and women's event on the right. The bumps chart represents the progress of every crew over all four days of the racing. To follow the progress of any particular crew, simply find the crew's name on the left side of the chart and follow the line to the end-of-the-week finishing position on the right of the chart.

Note that this chart may not be displayed correctly if you are using a large font size on your browser. A simple way to check is to see that the first horizontal bold line, marking the boundary between divisions, lies between positions 17 and 18. The combined Hughes Hall/Lucy Cavendish women's crews are listed as Lucy Cavendish only.

The Getting-on Race

The Getting-on Race (GoR) allows a number of crews which did not already have a place from last year's races to compete for the right to race this year. Up to ten crews are removed from the bottom of last year's finishing order, who must then race alongside new entrants to decide which crews gain a place.

The 2012 May Bumps Getting-on Race took place on 8 June 2012.

Competing crews

Men

12 men's crews competed for 8 available spaces at the bottom of the 6th division. 

The following were unsuccessful.

The following did not race.

Women

11 women's crews competed for 6 available spaces at the bottom of the 4th division.  

The following were unsuccessful.

The following did not race.

References
CUCBC - the organisation that runs the bumps
Cam FM 97.2FM (Cambridge University Radio - formerly CUR1350) - live commentary, instant results, downloadable MP3s of race commentary

May Bumps results
May Bumps
May Bumps
May Bumps